Under the Influence is the third studio album by thrash metal band Overkill, released on July 5, 1988 through Megaforce Records and Atlantic Records. This was Overkill's first album to feature drummer Sid Falck, who had replaced Rat Skates when the latter left the band in 1987 during the Taking Over tour.

Touring and promotion
Overkill toured for six months to promote Under the Influence, touring alongside thrash acts Nuclear Assault, M.O.D., Destruction and Testament. From October to December 1988, the band toured the United States with Slayer and Motörhead, followed by a European tour with Slayer and Nuclear Assault, which took place in January 1989.

Reception

Jason Anderson at AllMusic awarded Under the Influence three stars out of five, calling it "another confident, if unremarkable Overkill recording", while listing "Overkill III (Under the Influence)", "Shred", "Never Say Never" and "Hello from the Gutter" as highlights. The album reached No. 142 on the U.S. Billboard 200 and remained on that chart for thirteen weeks, making it Overkill's longest Billboard run. It is also their third highest-charting album to date, with over 300,000 copies sold worldwide as of 1997.

Track listing

Personnel
Bobby "Blitz" Ellsworth – lead vocals
D.D. Verni – bass, backing vocals
Bobby Gustafson – guitars, backing vocals
Sid Falck – drums

Additional personnel
Overkill – production
Alex Perialas – engineering, production
Rob Hunter – engineering assistance
Michael Wagener – mixing
Lori Fumar – mixing assistance
George Marino – mastering
Jon Zazula, Marsha Zazula – executive production
Dan Muro, Pat Calello – art direction
Rich Larson, Steve Fastner – cover illustration

Charts

References

1988 albums
Overkill (band) albums
Albums produced by Alex Perialas
Megaforce Records albums